Hugo Girard (born December 20, 1971) is a Canadian former strongman. He is a Strongman Super Series world Champion, a four-time World Muscle Power champion and a six-time Canada's Strongest Man. With 15 international competition wins, he's the eighth most decorated strongman in history.

Strength career
Prior to his career as a strongman competitor, Girard worked as a bouncer in a popular Quebec City nightclub on weekends while attending community college. In the early 1990s, he went to Los Angeles in order to either pursue a career as a professional bodybuilder or as an actor. After a few months, Girard came back to the province of Quebec where he was later hired as a police officer for the city of Gatineau.

Girard focused on Strongman competition, and became a 6-time consecutive finalist in the World's Strongest Man competition from 1998-2004. Girard's highest placing was 4th place at the 1999 World's Strongest Man contest.

In 2002 Girard reached the high point of his career to date, winning the 2002 Strongman Super Series overall title. Girard has also won the World Muscle Power Championships 4 times, in 1999, 2001, 2003, and 2004.

Girard dominated strongman competition in Canada for several years. He was the Canada's Strongest Man champion from 1999 to 2004. He was also the North America's Strongest Man champion in 2001 and 2002.

Beginning in 2004, injuries began to plague his career including back to back injuries to his achilles tendon in 2005, the first of which took place at the 2005 Arnold Strongman Classic forcing him to retire from the contest. These injuries required a long period of rehabilitation, and nearly a year and a half to fully recover. At one point Girard was in a cast up to his waist. Girard's comeback took place at the 2006 Mohegan Sun Super Series event. After winning the first event, he tore his patellar tendon in the second event, the Conan's Wheel and was forced to retire from the contest. He attempted to compete in the North America's Strongest Man Competition in 2007, but withdrew due to injury. Girard was able to bounce back in 2008, winning Quebec's Strongest Man. This win qualified Girard for the 2008 Canada's Strongest Man contest. Girard was leading the contest after the first day, but suffered yet another injury on the second day of competition and tearfully announced his retirement from strongman competition.

Girard broke several records during his career, some of which are still standing today. He has held records in events such as the log press, apollon's axle press, crucifix hold, farmer's walk Atlas stones, bench press, truck pull and squat. He has also pulled an 80-ton Boeing 737 for a short distance.

Due to his strength, Girard is often compared to fellow Quebec native Louis Cyr, a dominant nineteenth-century strongman who was considered the strongest man in history at the turn of the century. Girard has trained several other strongmen in the Ottawa and Gatineau regions, including Travis Lyndon and Jessen Paulin, who has participated in the World's Strongest Man competition and succeeded Girard as Canada's Strongest Man in 2005 and 2006.

Girard is currently a member of the organization of the Gatineau Hot Air Balloon Festival that takes place every Labour Day weekend. He is also the current president of the Canadian Federation of Strength Athletes. In addition to his career as a strongman, Girard served as a police officer for 12 years.

Girard was the subject of a documentary film called "Strongman: Hugo Girard" in 2002. The film shows Girard's training for the 2002 North America's Strongest Man competition, which he eventually won. The film also features his training partners Jessen Paulin and Travis Lyndon. The film was directed by Alan Black and released by Top of the World Films.

Profile
 Biceps: 55 cm (22 inches)
 Neck : 53 cm (21 inches)
 Calves: 55 cm (22 inches)
 Chest: 158 cm (62 inches)
 Quadriceps: 85 cm (33 inches)
 Height: 182 cm (6 feet 0 inches)
 Weight: 150 kg (330 pounds)

References

External links
Hugo Girard's website
United Athletes Magazine Interview with Hugo about the importance of determination in sports.

1971 births
Canadian police officers
Canadian strength athletes
Living people
People from Côte-Nord
Sportspeople from Quebec